The 1914 Indianapolis Hoosiers season was a season in American baseball. The Hoosiers won the inaugural Federal League championship, finishing 88–65, 1½ games ahead of the Chicago Federals.

Offseason 
 Prior to 1914 season: Frank Harter jumped to the Hoosiers from the Cincinnati Reds.

Regular season 
The offensive star of the team was outfielder Benny Kauff, who led the league in batting average (.370), runs scored (120), and stolen bases (75). Future Hall of Famers Edd Roush and Bill McKechnie also saw significant playing time, and Indianapolis scored a league-high 762 runs. Their rotation ace, Cy Falkenberg, went 25–16 with a 2.22 earned run average; he topped the circuit with 236 strikeouts.

Season standings

Record vs. opponents

Roster

Player stats

Batting

Starters by position 
Note: Pos = Position; G = Games played; AB = At bats; H = Hits; Avg. = Batting average; HR = Home runs; RBI = Runs batted in

Other batters 
Note: G = Games played; AB = At bats; H = Hits; Avg. = Batting average; HR = Home runs; RBI = Runs batted in

Pitching

Starting pitchers 
Note: G = Games pitched; IP = Innings pitched; W = Wins; L = Losses; ERA = Earned run average; SO = Strikeouts

Other pitchers 
Note: G = Games pitched; IP = Innings pitched; W = Wins; L = Losses; ERA = Earned run average; SO = Strikeouts

Relief pitchers 
Note: G = Games pitched; W = Wins; L = Losses; SV = Saves; ERA = Earned run average; SO = Strikeouts

Notes

References 
1914 Indianapolis Hoosiers at Baseball Reference

Indianapolis Hoosiers season
1914 in Indiana